Fairbanks is a surname. Notable people with the surname include:

Arthur Fairbanks (1864–1944), American art historian and administrator
Avard Fairbanks (1897–1987), American sculptor
Charles Rufus Fairbanks (1790–1841), Canadian lawyer, judge, entrepreneur and politician
Charles W. Fairbanks (1852–1918), American politician, Vice President of the United States under President Theodore Roosevelt
Charles H. Fairbanks (1913–1984), American archaeologist and anthropologist
Chuck Fairbanks (1933–2013), American football coach
Cornelia Cole Fairbanks (1852–1913), American women's suffragist
Dana Fairbanks, fictional character in American TV drama The L Word
Douglas Fairbanks (1883–1939), American actor, screenwriter, director, and producer
Douglas Fairbanks, Jr. (1909–2000), American actor and naval officer
Edward Fairbanks (1850–1924), Canadian merchant and politician
Erastus Fairbanks (1792–1864), American manufacturer and politician
Franklin Fairbanks (1828–1895), American businessman and politician
Gene Fairbanks (born 1982) Australian professional rugby union footballer
George Rainsford Fairbanks (1820-1906), American lawyer, politician and fruit grower
Horace Fairbanks (1820–1888), American politician, Governor of Vermont
Jason Fairbanks (1780–1801),American murderer
Jerry Fairbanks (1904–1995), American film and TV producer and director
John B. Fairbanks (1855–1940), American Latter-day Saint artist
Jonathan Fairbanks (1594–1668), English colonist in New England
Jonathan Leo Fairbanks (born 1933), American artist
Joseph Fairbanks (1718–1796), Canadian merchant and politician
E. LeBron Fairbanks (born 1942), American retired minister in the Church of the Nazarene
Lloyd Fairbanks (born 1953), former Canadian football player
Lucile Fairbanks (1917–1999), American actress
Mabel Fairbanks (1915–2001),  American figure skater and coach
Madeline and Marion Fairbanks (1900–1989 and 1900–1973), American twins, stage and film actresses
Nola Fairbanks (1924–2021), American actress
Ortho R. Fairbanks (1925–2015), American artist
Pete Fairbanks (born 1993), American baseball player
Ralph Jacobus Fairbanks (1857–1943), American prospector, entrepreneur and pioneer
Richard M. Fairbanks (1941–2013), American lawyer, diplomat and businessman
Thaddeus Fairbanks (1796–1886), American inventor
William Fairbanks (1894–1945), American actor

See also
Fairbank (surname)
Fairbanks family